Gunja may refer to:

 Gunja, Croatia, a village and a municipality in eastern Croatia
 Gunja, Iran, a village in Gilan Province, Iran
 Gunja, Pakistan, a village in Punjab, Pakistan
 Gunja Station, a station of Seoul Subway in South Korea
 Gunja-dong, a neighbourhood of Gwangjin-gu in Seoul, South Korea

See also
 Ganja